Torpes may refer to:

Torpes of Pisa, early Christian martyr
Torpes, Doubs, a commune in the French region of Franche-Comté
Torpes, Saône-et-Loire a commune in the French region of Bourgogne

See also
 Torpe (disambiguation)
 Torp (disambiguation)